The Asia/Oceania Zone is one of three zones of regional competition in the 2007 Davis Cup.

Group I

Group II

 and  relegated to Group III in 2008.
 promoted to Group I in 2008.

Group III
Venue: Sri Lanka Tennis Association, Colombo, Sri Lanka (hard)
Date: 16–22 July

Top two teams advance to 1st–4th Play-off, bottom two teams advance to 5th–8th Play-off. Scores in italics carried over from pools.

Note: Oman/Lebanon/Sri Lanka tie broken on number of rubbers won.

Oman and Lebanon promoted to Group II in 2008.
Singapore and Saudi Arabia relegated to Group IV in 2008.

Group IV
Venue: Theinbyu Tennis Plaza, Yangon, Myanmar (hard)
Date: 9–13 May

Tajikistan and Syria promoted to Group III in 2008.

See also
Davis Cup structure

 
Asia Oceania
Davis Cup Asia/Oceania Zone